Onishi Yasuaki (Japanese, 大西康明) is a Japanese artist working in the mediums of installation, sculpture, and painting.

Biography 
Yasuaki Onishi studied sculpture at University of Tsukuba and Kyoto City University of Arts, Japan. His sculptures are made from a mix of materials, including tree branches, wire, hot glue, and urea.

Yasuaki uses boxes to map out the eventual shape of his piece, draping a sheet of plastic over them. He attaches the plastic sheet from above using strands of glue, until the boxes can safely be removed without much altering the "landscape". In this sense, the process and finished installation look completely different.

His work has been exhibited in solo shows across Japan and abroad, and included in both Ways of Worldmaking in 2011 and National Museum of Art, Osaka.

In 2010, Yasuaki was the recipient of a United States-Japan Foundation Fellowship that included a residency at the Vermont Studio Center, as well as a grant from The Pollock-Krasner Foundation Inc., New York.

His most recent solo exhibition in the United States was in 2012 at the Marlin and Regina Miller Gallery at Kutztown University in Kutztown, Pennsylvania.

His piece "Reverse of Volume" was the central feature in the 2015 annual exhibition "Vide et Plein" of Paris-based Maison Bleu Studio.

In 2016, Yasuaki did a large installation for the Fresh Paint Contemporary Art & Design Fair, Tel-Aviv's largest and most influential annual art event in Israel.

Prizes 
 Granship Art Compe, prize, 2014
 Sakuyakonohana prize, 2014
 Pola Art Foundation, 2011
 U.S. Japan Award Fellowship, Vermont Studio Center, 2010
 Pollock-Krasner Foundation, 2010
 Kala Art Institute, fellowship, 2009
 IASK Asia Pacific Artists Fellowship National Museum of Contemporary Art Korea, 2009
 Winner of the Shuo foundation prize, 2007
 Winner of the Amuse Art Jam Kyoto, 2005
 Epson Color Imaging Contest Judge prize, 2003

Collaboration 
In a collaboration with Mercedes-Benz, Onishi Yasuaki did a sculptural installation based on the CLA model of Mercedes-Benz, the video Shaping Air was directed by German director Björn Fischer.

Selected group exhibitions 
 2015 Vide et Plein, Maison Bleu Studio, Paris, France
 2014 in Search of Critical Imagination/Fukuoka Art Museum, Fukuoka, Japan 
 2010 Art Court Frontier #8/Art Court Gallery, Osaka, Japan
 2009 phantasmagoria/Ieyoung Contemporary Art Museum, Suwon, Korea
 2009 Changwon Asian Art Festival/Sung-San Art Hall, Changwon, Korea

Selected solo exhibitions 
 2015 reverse of volume, Regional Contemporary Art Fund Centre, France
 2014 vertical emptiness/Gallery Out of Place, Tokyo, Japan
 2013 reverse of volume/Joice Gallery, Beijing, China
 2012 inner space/The Wilfrid Israel Museum of Asian Art and Studies, Hazorea, Israel
 2012 reverse of volume/Rice Gallery, Houston, USA
 2011 reverse of volume/Aichi Prefectural Museum, Nagoya, Japan
 2010 reverse of volume/Vermont Studio Center Red Mill Gallery, Johnson, United States
 2010 horizontal forest/Not Quite Gallery, Fengersfors, Sweden
 2010 ridge of boundary/para_Site Gallery, Graz, Austria
 2010 reverse of volume/Kinokino Centre for Art and Film, Sandnes, Norway
 2008 mountair/Kongsi, Enschede, Netherlands
 2008 dairy distance/Solyst Artists in Residence Centre, Jyderup, Denmark
 2007 inner skin/neutron, Kyoto, Japan
 2007 vertical clue/Gallery b. Tokyo, Tokyo, Japan
 2007 space between face and reverse/Pantaloon, Osaka, Japan
 2006 vertex/neutron, Kyoto, Japan
 2006 visible/Sfera Exhibition, Kyoto, Japan
 2005 breath nebula/Inax Gallery 2, Tokyo, Japan
 2005 clue in the void/Sfera Exhibition, Kyoto, Japan
 2005 clue in the case/neutron, Kyoto, Japan
 2005 restriction sight/under public, Osaka, Japan
 2004 restriction sight/neutron B1 Gallery, Kyoto, Japan
 2004 see darkness/Gallery b. Tokyo, Tokyo, Japan
 2003 thing of darkness/Gallery b. Tokyo, Tokyo, Japan

References

External links 
 http://www.onys.net/en

Japanese artists
Living people
University of Tsukuba alumni
Kyoto City University of Arts alumni
Year of birth missing (living people)